Shaggy pea is a common name for several plants and may refer to:

 Oxylobium, a genus of flowering plants native to Australia
 Podolobium, a genus of flowering plants native to eastern Australia